Mushaway Peak is a small but conspicuous butte located  southeast of Gail in central Borden County, Texas.  It is one of the region's most venerable landmarks.

Mushaway Peak is in fact an erosional remnant of what was once a much larger Llano Estacado that has gradually retreated by the process of headward erosion. Its resistant cap has protected its underlying sediments, which have remained intact while surrounding sediments have been eroded away by Grape Creek and Bull Creek, two tributaries of the upper Colorado River.

Proper name
Mushaway Peak has been known by various names, including: Cordova Mountain, Cordova Peak, De Corde Peak, Mount Irwin, Mochaquo Mountain, Muchakooago Peak, Mucha Koo Ave, Mucha Kooay Mountain, Muchakooayo Peak, Muchakooay Peak, Mucha Koody Mountain, Mucha Kooga, Muchakooga Peak, Muchakooyo Peak, Mucha Kowa Peak, Mucha Koway Peak, Muchaque Peak, or simply Old Baldy.  In a 1936 decision of the United States Board on Geographical Names, "Muchakooay Peak" was recommended as proper orthography.  However, the 1936 decision was revised in 1973  when "Mushaway Peak" was selected as the official name of this geographic feature.

See also
Caprock Escarpment
Double Mountains (Texas)
Duffy's Peak
Farm to Market Road 669
Mount Blanco

References

External links

Geology of Texas
Landforms of Borden County, Texas
Rock formations of Texas